Mahatma Gandhi is an outdoor sculpture of the Indian independence movement leader of the same name, installed at Hermann Park's McGovern Centennial Gardens in Houston, Texas, in the United States. The statue was dedicated in Hermann Park on October 2, 2004.

See also
 2004 in art
 List of artistic depictions of Mahatma Gandhi
 List of public art in Houston

References

External links
 Open Letter to Houston City Council: Permanently Removal of Hermann Park Gandhi Statue, Organization for Minorities of India

2004 establishments in Texas
2004 sculptures
Hermann Park
Monuments and memorials in Texas
Outdoor sculptures in Houston
Sculptures of men in Texas
Statues in Houston
Houston